Paolo Tiralongo (born 8 July 1977) is an Italian former professional road bicycle racer, who rode professionally between 2000 and 2017 for the , ,  and  teams.

Career
He joined Astana for the 2010 season, on a 2-year contract. In 2011, Tiralongo took a notable victory on stage 19 of the Giro d'Italia, a summit finish to Macugnaga. He attacked in the final kilometers and went clear of the lead group, but was joined by Alberto Contador in the final few meters. He came first on the line, taking his first victory in more than ten years.

In 2012, he won another stage in the Giro d'Italia, stage 7, which was a hilltop finish atop Rocca di Cambio. He lay on the ground afterward, out of breath.

On 24 April 2015, Tiralongo collected his first victory of the season in the final stage of the Giro del Trentino. He passed the last climb (Passo Predaia) with a small leading group and won the sprint after the descent. On 17 May, he won Stage 9 of the 2015 Giro d'Italia.

Major results

1998
 1st Gran Premio di Poggiana
 3rd Overall Giro Ciclistico d'Italia
1999
 1st Overall Triptyque Ardennais
 3rd Road race, National Under-23 Road Championships
2001
 2nd Trofeo dello Scalatore III
 3rd Overall Tour of Austria
 6th Gran Premio della Costa Etruschi
 8th Giro della Provincia di Siracusa
 9th GP Industria & Artigianato di Larciano
 10th Trofeo dello Scalatore I
2002
 2nd Overall Tour Méditerranéen
 6th Overall Brixia Tour
 8th Coppa Ugo Agostoni
 10th Trofeo Pantalica
2003
 8th Overall Settimana Internazionale di Coppi e Bartali
 10th Overall Giro del Trentino
 10th Giro dell'Appennino
2004
 1st  Mountains classification Tour Down Under
 2nd Overall Brixia Tour
 2nd Trofeo Melinda
 2nd GP Citta di Rio Saliceto e Correggio
 5th Giro del Medio Brenta
 7th Tre Valli Varesine
 7th Giro della Romagna
 8th Giro del Veneto
2005
 3rd Milano–Torino
 3rd Trofeo Laigueglia
 6th Overall Settimana Internazionale di Coppi e Bartali
 6th Gran Premio Fred Mengoni
 8th Giro d'Oro
2008
 6th Klasika Primavera
2009
 8th Overall Vuelta a España
 10th Giro dell'Emilia
2011
 1st Stage 19 Giro d'Italia
2012
 1st Stage 7 Giro d'Italia
2013
 1st Stage 1 (TTT) Vuelta a España
2014
 9th Overall Vuelta a Burgos
2015
 1st Stage 4 Giro del Trentino
 1st Stage 9 Giro d'Italia

Grand Tour general classification results timeline

References

External links 

Paolo Tiralongo's profile on Cycling Base

1977 births
Living people
People from Avola
Italian male cyclists
Italian Giro d'Italia stage winners
Sportspeople from the Province of Syracuse
Cyclists from Sicily